The ninth edition of Dancing Stars was broadcast from March 7, 2014 on ORF1 and was presented by Mirjam Weichselbraun and Klaus Eberhartinger.

Couples

Scoring Chart

Highest and lowest scoring performances of the series 
The best and worst performances in each dance according to the judges' marks are as follows:

Average Chart

Average Dance Chart

Dance order 

Individual judges scores in charts below (given in parentheses) are listed in this order from left to right: Thomas Schäfer-Elmayer, Nicole Burns-Hansen, Balazs Ekker and Hannes Nedbal.

Week 1

Week 2

Week 3: "Aus für Andrea Buday"

Week 4: "Aus für Andrea Puschl"

Week 5: "Aus für Daniel Serafin"

Week 6: "Aus für Morteza Tavakoli"

Week 7: "Aus für Erik Schinegger"

Week 8: "Aus für Lisbeth Bischoff"

Week 9: "Aus für Melanie Binder"

Week 10: "Das Finale"

Dance Chart

 Highest scoring dance
 Lowest scoring dance

References
Official website of Dancing Stars

Season 09
2014 Austrian television seasons